Fetal fibronectin (fFN) is a fibronectin protein produced by fetal cells. It is found at the interface of the chorion and the decidua (between the fetal sac and the uterine lining). In a normal case, fFN is found at low levels in cervicovaginal secretions.

It can be thought of as an adhesive or "biological glue" that binds the fetal sac to the uterine lining.

Screening test

Fetal fibronectin "leaks" into the vagina if a preterm delivery is likely to occur and can be measured in a screening test.

Testing will produce a negative or a positive result.  When the fFN test is positive, the result is an excellent predictor of preterm labor risk. A negative result means that there is little possibility of preterm labor within the next 7 to 10 days, and the test can be repeated weekly for women who remain at high risk. A negative fetal fibronectin says that a patient has less than 5% chance of giving birth in the next two weeks. A positive result is a less reliable indicator that a woman will go into preterm labor. A systematic review of the medical literature found that fetal fibronectin is a good predictor of spontaneous preterm birth before cervical dilation. The test may be run on patients between 22 and 34 weeks gestation. 

The test is easily performed and is usually painless. A specimen is collected from the patient using a vaginal swab. The swab is placed in a transport tube and sent to a laboratory for testing. Most labs can easily produce a result in less than one hour.

At or after 22 weeks of gestation, fFN levels greater than or equal to 50 ng/mL are associated with an increased risk of spontaneous preterm birth.

A false positive fetal fibronectin result can occur if the test is performed after digital examination of the cervix or after having had intercourse. It is important that the swab be taken before a digital vaginal exam is performed.

See also
Fibronectin
Fibronectin type II domain
Premature labor

References

External links
 Fibronectin Test - FibronectinTest.co.uk

Embryology
Tests during pregnancy

de:Fibronektin#Fetales Fibronektin